The Belarus Free Trade Union (SPB) is a trade union centre in Belarus. Its headquarters are located in Minsk. In October 2020, during the 2020 Belarusian protests, SPB was classified as "independent" of the government by Marina Vorobei of ProfSoyuz Online, a working group for independent trade union organising supported by the Coordination Council aiming at a transition of political power from Aleksander Lukashenko.

References

Other

1991 establishments in Belarus
National trade union centers of Belarus
Trade unions established in 1991